The Melbourne Harlequins Rugby Union Club is an Australian rugby union team formed in 1928.  Originally membership was restricted to people born in Britain, but this restriction was removed by the 1950s.  Although Rugby is the main sport, the club still plays friendly cricket, golf and darts. One of Melbourne's largest and oldest clubs, Quins promote the ethos of running with the ball in hand. The club has teams in all Junior age groups (U6 to U18), youth girls 7s (U11 and U15) and six Senior teams including a women's team. 1st Grade have been "Dewar Shield" Premiers 5 times in the last 10 seasons (2013, 2014, 2015, 2017 and 2022) and the Colts U20 have been Premiers 5 times this decade including an undefeated Premiership season in 2019. The club claimed their 5th consecutive Cowper Shield Club Championship in 2021 as the best overall performing club in Victoria across Seniors and Juniors. 

Boasting Melbourne's best rugby facilities, the club's main field in 2019 underwent a $1 million upgrade to create a premium national standard playing surface coupled with a full replay electronic scoreboard being installed and regularly hosts Melbourne Rebels, Melbourne Rising and Rugby Victoria representative teams games and training.

Club colours
According to the constitution the club colours are Black, Maroon, Sage Green and Pale Blue. These have been further defined very specifically by the club as being:

References

Rugby union teams in Victoria (Australia)
Rugby clubs established in 1928
Sporting clubs in Melbourne
1928 establishments in Australia
Sport in the City of Monash